Vũ Khoan is a former Deputy Prime Minister of the Socialist Republic of Vietnam.

References

External links 

Living people
Government ministers of Vietnam
Deputy Prime Ministers of Vietnam
Year of birth missing (living people)
Members of the 9th Secretariat of the Communist Party of Vietnam
Members of the 7th Central Committee of the Communist Party of Vietnam
Members of the 8th Central Committee of the Communist Party of Vietnam
Members of the 9th Central Committee of the Communist Party of Vietnam